Alexis Andrés Domínguez Ansorena (born 30 October 1996) is an Argentine professional footballer who plays as a centre-forward for Gimnasia La Plata, on loan from Tristán Suárez.

Career
San Lorenzo were Domínguez's first senior club. On 1 January 2016, Domínguez joined Gimnasia y Esgrima on loan in Torneo Federal A. He made one appearance, versus Gutiérrez on 13 April, before returning to San Lorenzo. In the following August, Domínguez was loaned to Peruvian Primera División side Universidad San Martín. His professional debut arrived on 24 August against Ayacucho, which was followed by his first goal weeks later during a win over Alianza Lima. In total, he scored three times in twenty-five games across the 2016 and 2017 Peruvian Primera División campaigns.

On 17 July 2018, Domínguez completed a move to Guayaquil City of the Ecuadorian Serie A. He made his debut versus Universidad Católica on 24 July, playing sixty-eight minutes of a goalless draw. He departed on 31 December 2018, having netted three goals in fourteen Serie A fixtures. In February 2019, Domínguez remained in Ecuador to sign for Serie B's Independiente Juniors. In his opening six months, the centre-forward scored thirteen goals in twenty-three matches in all competitions. Domínguez left at the end of 2019, subsequently returning to Argentina with Primera B Nacional's Estudiantes.

In February 2021, Domínguez moved to Tristán Suárez. In July 2021, Domínguez joined Gimnasia La Plata on a 18-month loan deal for a fee around $2.750.000, with a purchase option of 60% of the pass for $275,000.

Career statistics
.

References

External links

1996 births
Living people
People from Malvinas Argentinas Partido
Argentine footballers
Association football forwards
Argentine expatriate footballers
Argentine Primera División players
Torneo Federal A players
Peruvian Primera División players
Ecuadorian Serie A players
Ecuadorian Serie B players
Primera Nacional players
San Lorenzo de Almagro footballers
Gimnasia y Esgrima de Mendoza footballers
Club Deportivo Universidad de San Martín de Porres players
Guayaquil City F.C. footballers
Estudiantes de Buenos Aires footballers
CSyD Tristán Suárez footballers
Club de Gimnasia y Esgrima La Plata footballers
Expatriate footballers in Peru
Expatriate footballers in Ecuador
Argentine expatriate sportspeople in Peru
Argentine expatriate sportspeople in Ecuador
Sportspeople from Buenos Aires Province